Tul Lat (also Romanized as Ţūl Lāt; also known as Ţūleh Lāt-e Āzār Key) is a village in Rahimabad Rural District, Rahimabad District, Rudsar County, Gilan Province, Iran. At the 2006 census, its population was 841, in 214 families.

References 

Populated places in Rudsar County